Charles Henry Alexandrowicz (13 October 190226 September 1975), born Karol Aleksandrowicz, was a lawyer and scholar of international law.

Born in Lviv, Alexandrowicz attended primary school at the Schottengymnasium in Vienna and studied law at Jagiellonian University, graduating with a doctorate in 1926. Subsequently, he worked for the Bank of Poland for three years, and then until 1939 practised law in Kraków and Katowice. Just before the outbreak of war in 1939, he accepted a lectureship at the Higher School of Social Sciences in Katowice. At the beginning of hostilities, Alexandrowicz was commissioned into the Polish army and was involved in fighting against both Soviet and German forces before the collapse of the Polish government. He then was able to escape to Romania, where he with other exiles attempted to preserve the continuity of the Polish state. Increasing hostility from the Romanian authorities led Alexandrowicz and other exiles to decamp first to Istanbul and then, eventually, to London, where the Polish government-in-exile had been established after the fall of France. Initially, Alexandrowicz acted as a financial counsellor to the Polish embassy and then as a governor of the Polish national development bank, Bank Gospodarstwa Krajowego. He simultaneously served in the British Home Guard. In 1945, Alexandrowicz was appointed Director-General of the European Central Inland Transport Organization (ECITO), a new United Nations specialist agency.

Following the absorption of ECITO by the Economic Commission for Europe in 1947, Alexandrowicz returned to the law and was called to the bar of Lincoln's Inn in 1948. He became a British citizen in 1950.

From London he moved to India in 1951 to teach at the University of Madras, publishing on Indian constitutional law. He spent a decade at the university and then moved to the University of Sydney in 1961. He retired from academic life in 1967.

Alexandrowicz's scholarship emphasises a tradition of international law rooted in the work of natural law theorists such as Grotius—a tradition he saw as universalist—as opposed to later European theorists, who embraced Eurocentric views of the law of nations.

Publications (partial)

References

Sources

Further reading 
 

1902 births
1975 deaths
International law scholars
Jagiellonian University alumni
Naturalised citizens of the United Kingdom
Academic staff of the University of Madras
Academic staff of the University of Sydney